Samus may refer to:

Samus Aran, the protagonist of Nintendo's Metroid video game series
Samus (genus), a genus of sea sponges
Samus, female variant of the Celtic given name Séamus
Samus, the Dacian name of the Someș River
Samus (rural locality), a rural locality in Tomsk Oblast, Russia
Samus (poet) (≈183 BCE), Macedonian poet
SAMUS: South African Music Studies, a peer-reviewed academic journal, and the official journal of the South African Society for Research in Music (SASRIM)
Sammus (born 1986), rapper from Ithaca, New York